A general election was held in the U.S. state of Wyoming on Tuesday, November 8, 1898. All of the state's executive officers—the Governor, Secretary of State, Auditor, Treasurer, and Superintendent of Public Instruction—were up for election. The Republican Party retained all of the offices up for election, though by reduced margins from 1894 as the Populist Party's performance decreased considerably.

Governor

Incumbent Republican Governor William A. Richards ran for re-election to a second term, but was defeated for renomination at the Republican convention by DeForest Richards. In the general election, Richards faced former State Representative Horace C. Alger, whom he defeated, but by a narrower margin than Governor Richards won by in 1894.

Secretary of State
Incumbent Republican Secretary of State Charles W. Burdick did not seek re-election to a second term. At the Republican convention, Fenimore Chatterton, a former State Senator, was nominated. He faced Rock Springs businessman David Miller, a former Cheyenne City Councilman and former territorial legislator, in the general election. Chatterton ultimately defeated Miller by a decisive margin, but reduced from four years prior.

General election

Results

Auditor
Incumbent Republican State Auditor William O. Owen declined to run for re-election. The Republican convention nominated LeRoy Grant, the deputy state revenue collector and a former State Representative from Albany County, as Owen's successor. In the general election, Grant was opposed by Charles H. Priest, a state water commissioner and former Uinta County Treasurer. Priest was a Free Silver Republican, who was nominated for State Auditor as part of a fusion deal with the state Democratic Party. However, despite Priest's bipartisan appeal, Owen defeated him in a landslide.

General election

Results

Treasurer
Incumbent Republican Treasurer Henry G. Hay was barred from seeking a second consecutive term as a Treasurer. State Senate President George E. Abbott was nominated as Hay's successor at the Republican state convention, and former Territorial Treasurer Luke Voorhees, a former Republican, was nominated as his replacement at the Democratic convention, beating out Colin Hunter. In the general election, Abbott defeated Voorhees by a wide margin.

General election

Results

Superintendent of Public Instruction
Incumbent Republican Superintendent Estelle Reed resigned from office on January 27, 1898, and Carroll H. Parmelee was appointed by Governor Richards as Reed's replacement. Parmelee declined to seek re-election to a full term, and Thomas T. Tynan, the Clerk of the Fourth Judicial District Court, was nominated at the Republican convention for Superintendent. At the Democratic convention, Jerome F. Brown, a State Representative from Sheridan County, was nominated. Brown was a Free Silver Republican and was nominated by the Democratic convention as part of a fusion with Silver Republicans.

General election

Results

References

 
Wyoming